Intel is an American multinational corporation and technology company headquartered in Santa Clara, California. Processors are manufactured in semiconductor fabrication plants called "fabs" which are then sent to assembly and testing sites before delivery to customers. Approximately 75% of Intel's semiconductor fabrication is performed in the United States.

Current fab sites

Past fab sites

Assembly and test sites
AFO, Aloha, Oregon, United States
Chandler, Arizona, United States
CD1, Chengdu, Sichuan, China
CD6, Chengdu, Sichuan, China
KMO, Kulim, Malaysia
KM5, Kulim, Malaysia
PG8, Penang, Malaysia
VNAT, Ho Chi Minh City, Vietnam
Jerusalem, Israel
CRAT, Heredia, Belén, Costa Rica (1997–2014; 2020 – present)
Makati, Philippines – MN1-MN5 also known as A2/T11 (1974–2009)
Cavite, Philippines – CV1-CV4 (1997–2009)
Shanghai, China (former Assembly / Test Manufacturing)
Las Piedras Puerto Rico 1991-2001(assemble Pentium CPU/Motherboards)

See also
 List of semiconductor fabrication plants

External links
Global Manufacturing at Intel

References

Manufacturing sites
Computing-related lists
Manufacturing plants
Lists of industrial buildings
Manufacturing-related lists